Oakfield Demesne is a house, grounds and townland in County Donegal, Ireland, originally built in 1739 for the Dean of Raphoe. Since 1996 it has been owned by Sir Gerry Robinson and his wife, Lady Heather Robinson. The demesne includes the 100-acre Oakfield Park gardens, open to the public  which includes the  narrow-gauge railway Difflin Lake Railway.

History
The house that is central to the estate was originally built by the Church of Ireland for the Deanery of Raphoe in 1739.  It ceased to be used as a deanery after being sold to Captain Thomas Butler Stoney of the Donegal Militia in 1869.

Former occupants included Captain Stoney.  The Irish Republican Army were known to have occupied the house in the 1920s.  The Patterson family, known for their music, were owners during the twentieth century.

After purchasing the estate the Robinsons engaged the architect Tony Wright to transform the  overgrown estate into parklands, gardens and lakes to restore the house to its original condition.

Oakfield House
The house was built  1739 as a five-bay, two-storey with a dormer constructed over a basement.

Oakfield Park

The park was created by the Robinsons soon after the start of their stewardship; as an extension of the existing gardens which had become mainly disused. Some old trees did remain, including a 12-limbed horse Chestnut and a Spanish chestnut, calculated to be as old as the Battle of the Boyne.

To cater for the 2021 season in the COVID-19 pandemic additional outdoor covered seating has been provided for alfresco diners.

Difflin Lake Railway

References

Footnotes

Sources

External links
 Official website

Gardens in County Donegal